Bahçesaray is town and district in Van Province in Turkey. It was a bucak in Pervari district of Siirt Province until 1964 and Gevaş district of Van Province between 1964 and 1987. The town is built at the Bahçesaray rivers' shores.

Etymology 
The name comes from Persian باغچه سرای "bāghche-sarāy" which means "the Garden Palace". Its former name was Müküs, derived from Armenian Mokkʿ region. In , derived from the Armenian. The word "Mokk in classical Armenian language means: "the place of the magic". According to the legend, Amenap'rkich ("Wholly Saviour") abbey that was nearby Moks, has the grave of a magician by name Gaspar. Probably name of "the place of the magic" or just "Mokk" is connected with this mysterious personality. But scientific sources say that in the Urartu era there existed the Moxene tribe and Moxoene, so the names Mokk' and Moks originated from this tribe's name.
 
The word Bahçesaray is compound of bahçe ("garden") and saray ("palace"). Bakhchysarai in Crimea has the same name.

History 
The district corresponds to Historical Armenia's Mok Arandznak district, which was part of the greater province of Moxoene. The district has several ancient Armenian monasteries and churches. The Aparank monastery is located in the vicinity of the town.  

In the 19th century Bahçesaray was the center of the Kurdish Emirate of Müküs, until the emirate was defeated by the troops of Ottoman Empire in 1846.

2020 avalanches 

On 4 and 5 February 2020, a pair of avalanches struck a highway in the district, leaving at least 41 people dead and 84 others injured.

References

Towns in Turkey
Populated places in Van Province
Districts of Van Province
Kurdish settlements in Turkey